Chalk Mark in a Rain Storm is the 13th studio album by Canadian singer and songwriter Joni Mitchell, released in 1988. It was her third for Geffen Records. The album features various duets with guest artists such as Peter Gabriel on "My Secret Place", Willie Nelson on "Cool Water", Don Henley on "Snakes and Ladders", Billy Idol and Tom Petty on the track "Dancin' Clown". Henley also performs backing vocals on "Lakota", and Wendy and Lisa perform backing vocals on "The Tea Leaf Prophecy (Lay Down Your Arms)".

History
In early 1986, Mitchell and Larry Klein visited Peter Gabriel's Ashcombe House recording studio near Bath, England. Since Gabriel had mostly finished his album So by that time, he offered Mitchell and Klein the use of his studio if they wanted to record. They did, and the result was the track "My Secret Place" which was a duet between Mitchell and Gabriel. Mitchell told Musician magazine about this song: "It's a love beginning song. The song's about the threshold of intimacy. It's a shared thing so I wanted it to be like the Song of Solomon, where you can't tell what gender it is. It's the uniting spirit of two people at the beginning of a relationship".

In February 1987, Mitchell saw Billy Idol performing his hit version of the William Bell R&B ballad, "To Be a Lover" on the Grammy Awards show. She felt he captured the original spirit of rock'n'roll along with a new spark of energy, and would be perfect for a cameo on her song "Dancin' Clown". Idol came over to Mitchell's studio one evening a few days after the Grammys and recorded his part, complete with yelps and howls. Mitchell told Macleans magazine about this pairing up: "It was for the contrast he provided. It's a great little cameo for him, and he brings real life to the part." Later, Tom Petty recorded his cameo on the same song.

About Chalk Mark, Mitchell told interviewer Kristine McKenna: "I've discovered that with your focus no longer on finding a mate, you get a heightened sense of community, and I've become a bit more political – not too political though".

Chalk Mark in a Rain Storm was released in March 1988, and the song "Snakes and Ladders" (featuring Don Henley) was issued as a pre-release single to radio stations in January 1988.

Themes
Contemporary commercialism is addressed in the songs "Number One", "Lakota" which deals with the destruction of Native American culture and the unusual "The Reoccurring Dream" was constructed from samples Mitchell collected by recording TV commercials on her VCR for 2 weeks. "Cool Water" (a Mitchell rewrite of the Bob Nolan original) also discusses water pollution.

War is explored in two very different stories: "The Tea Leaf Prophecy (Lay Down Your Arms)" tells the tale of Mitchell's parents meeting during World War II after a surprisingly prophetic tea-leaf reading, while "The Beat of Black Wings" is about an embittered Vietnam vet named Killer Kyle, who found it difficult to get the sound of helicopter blades out of his head. This song may be based on a scene from the film adaptation of The Looking Glass War.

In the more straightforward lovesongs, Mitchell sings of intimacy in "My Secret Place", and young, rambunctious love in "Snakes and Ladders" and "Dancin' Clown".

Release

The first official single from the album was "My Secret Place". Released in March 1988. The video, shot by Dutch photographer and filmmaker Anton Corbijn on grainy, atmospheric black-and-white film featuring Mitchell and Peter Gabriel, got some airplay on VH-1, where it premiered in May 1988. The video was directed by photographer and film director Anton Corbijn, perhaps known best for his many music videos for Depeche Mode.

Billboard magazine's Steve Gett reviewed the album and awarded it an early rave. Other reviews were mostly very favorable, and the fact that there were cameos by many well-known musicians brought it a great deal of notice. "Most of the stuff for the isn't-Joni-wonderful club is on side two", noted Fred Dellar in Hi-Fi News & Record Review. "There's a Willie Nelson-assisted version of the Sons of the Pioneers' hoary old 'Cold [sic] Water' that is so immaculately re-shaped it sounds like next year's thing."

The album improved on the chart position of her previous album, 1985's Dog Eat Dog, peaking at number 23 in Canada, 45 on the US Billboard 200, and number 26 in the UK.

To promote the album, Mitchell also travelled to the UK in May and appeared on the Channel 4 music show Wired where she performed "Number One" and gave an exclusive world premiere of the song "Fourth of July", which would later be retitled "Night Ride Home" and be recorded as the title track for her next album. She also visited Australia and appeared on several television shows including The Midday Show with Ray Martin, Rock Arena, and the morning show Sunday where she again performed "Number One" and "Fourth of July".

Chalk Mark in a Rain Storm was nominated for Best Pop Vocal Performance, Female at the 1989 Grammy Awards, but lost to Tracy Chapman's "Fast Car".

Track listing

Personnel
Track numbering does not match the LP listing (above); it refers to CD and digital releases of the album.
 Joni Mitchell – vocals, guitar, keyboards, drum programming on 7, 8
 Manu Katché – drums, percussion, talking drum on 1, 7; snare drum on 2; background vocals
 Steve Lindsey – organ on 2
 Larry Klein – bass; keyboards on 1, 3, 4, 8; congas on 6; programming; background vocals on 5
 Michael Landau – guitar on 3, 4, 5, 6, 8, 9; background vocals on 5
 Steve Stevens – lead guitar on 5
 Wayne Shorter – saxophones on 10
 Thomas Dolby – marimba on 5
 Peter Gabriel – guest vocalist on 1
 Benjamin Orr – background vocals on 2, 7
 Don Henley – background vocals on 3, 8
 Iron Eyes Cody – guest vocalist on 3
 Wendy Melvoin – background vocals on 4
 Lisa Coleman – background vocals on 4
 Billy Idol – guest vocalist on 5
 Tom Petty – guest vocalist on 5
 Julie Last – background vocals on 5
 Willie Nelson – guest vocalist on 6

Charts

Certifications

References

1988 albums
Joni Mitchell albums
Albums produced by Larry Klein
Geffen Records albums
Albums produced by Joni Mitchell
Albums recorded at A&M Studios
Albums recorded at United Western Recorders